Lê Minh Khuê (born 6 December 1949, in Tĩnh Gia, Thanh Hoá) is a Vietnamese writer. Her works have been translated into English and several other languages.
 She was interviewed in Ken Burns's series The Vietnam War.

Works
Translations:
 The stars, the earth, the river: short fiction by Le Minh Khue translated by Wayne Karlin, Dana Sachs Curbstone Press, 1997
 Kleine Tragödien. Translated by Joachim Riethmann. Mitteldeutscher Verlag 2011
 Fragile come un raggio di sole. Racconti dal Vietnam. O Barra O Edizioni 2010
 Nach der Schlacht, Translated by Günter Giesenfeld, Marianne Ngo and Aurora Ngo, Argument Verlag 2017

References

Vietnamese writers
1949 births
Living people
Vietnamese women writers
21st-century Vietnamese women